Rosenblad is a Swedish language surname, which mean "rose leaf". Notable people with the surname include:

Carl Rosenblad (equestrian) (1886–1953), Swedish equestrian
Carl Rosenblad (racing driver) (born 1969), Swedish auto racing driver
Mathias Rosenblad (1758–1847), Swedish politician

Swedish-language surnames